Gregory Clark is the name of:

Academics and writers

Greg Clark (journalist) (1892–1977), Canadian author and journalist
Gregory Clark (author) (born 1936), Australian diplomat, author and Japan scholar
Gregory Clark (rhetorician) (born 1950), American rhetorician and professor
Gregory A. Clark (born 1954), associate professor of biomedical engineering at the University of Utah
Gregory Clark (economist) (born 1957), professor of economics and economic history at the University of California, Davis
Greg Clark (urbanist) (born 1962), expert on cities and regions

Politicians

Gregory S. Clark (1947–2012), Republican politician in Vermont
Greg Clark (born 1967), British MP and Former Cabinet Minister
Greg Clark (Canadian politician) (born 1971), Canadian politician in Alberta

Sportsmen

Greg Clark (tight end) (1972–2021), former tight end for the San Francisco 49ers
Greg Clark (linebacker) (born 1965), former linebacker for the Chicago Bears, Miami Dolphins and others
Greg Clark (Australian footballer) (born 1997), Australian rules footballer for the West Coast Eagles and West Perth

See also
Greg Clarke (born 1957), chairman of The Football Association